Par les fils de Mandrin is the fifth album by the French progressive rock band Ange, released in 1976.

Track listing
"Par les fils de Mandrin" (C. Décamps/J.M. Brézovar) – 4:48
"Au café du Colibri" (C. Décamps/J.P. Guichard) – 4:02
"Ainsi s'en ira la pluie" (C. Décamps/J.P. Guichard) – 6:08
"Autour du feu" (C. Décamps/D. Haas) – 3:06
"Saltimbanques" (C. Décamps/D. Haas) – 3:36
"Des yeux couleur d'enfants" (C. Décamps/F. Décamps) – 4:20
"Atlantis - Les Géants de la 3ème lune" (C. Décamps/F. Décamps) – 5:05
"Hymne à la Vie" (C. Décamps/J.M. Brézovar) – 9:44
"Cantique" – 4:16
"Procession" – 3:52 
"Hymne" – 1:37

Personnel
 Daniel Haas – bass, acoustic guitar
 Jean Michel Brezovar – electric guitar, acoustic guitar, vocals
 Jean Pierre Guichard – drums, percussion, harmonica, vocals
 Francis Decamps – organ, A.R.P. synthesizer, mellotron, vocals
 Christian Decamps – vocals, piano, percussion, accordion

Release history

References

1976 albums
Ange albums